Balasingam or Balasingham is a Tamil male given name. Due to the Tamil tradition of using patronymic surnames it may also be a surname for males and females.

Notable people

Given name
 Anton Balasingham (1938–2006), Sri Lankan rebel
 C. Balasingham (1917–2001), Ceylonese civil servant
 K. Balasingam (1876–1952), Ceylonese lawyer and politician

Surname
 Adele Balasingham (born 1950), British nurse
 Balasingham Nadesan (died 2009), Sri Lankan rebel

See also
 
 

Tamil masculine given names